Kofi Nimeley (born 11 December 1992) is a Swiss-Ghanaian professional footballer currently playing for SC Binningen.

Club career
Nimeley initially started his career with SV Muttenz but quickly moved on to FC Basel as an academy player. At Basel he was able to rise through the youth ranks and broke into their reserve team towards the end of the 2009–10 season. He made his debut for Basel II on 21 April 2010 in a 4–1 home win against SV Höngg, coming on as a late substitute. He scored his first goal for the club on 12 March 2011 in a match against Grasshopper Club Zürich II that ended in a 1–1 draw. After not being able to break into the Basel first-team, Nimeley transferred to FC Locarno of the Swiss Challenge League in July 2013. He made his debut for Locarno on 14 July 2014 in a 1–0 home win against FC Biel-Bienne.

International career
Nimeley was a Switzerland youth international, having previously competed at under-17, under-19, and under-20 level. In 2009, he was part of the Swiss under-17 team that won the 2009 FIFA U-17 World Cup beating the host nation Nigeria 1–0 in the final, featuring in five of the seven matches at the tournament and having been an integral part of the team in helping them qualify. Despite featuring for Switzerland at various youth levels, Nimeley has also expressed an interest in representing Ghana.

Honours
FIFA U-17 World Cup: 2009

References

External links
 

1992 births
Living people
Footballers from Accra
Swiss men's footballers
Switzerland youth international footballers
Ghanaian footballers
Swiss people of Ghanaian descent
Ghanaian emigrants to Switzerland
Association football defenders
Association football midfielders
FC Locarno players
Swiss Challenge League players
Sportspeople from Basel-Landschaft